Kincorth/Nigg/Cove is one of the thirteen wards used to elect members of the Aberdeen City Council. It elects three Councillors.

Councillors

Election results

2022 election

2020 by-election

2017 election
2017 Aberdeen City Council election

References

Wards of Aberdeen